Amarasigamani (12 November 1950 – 21 June 2021) was an Indian actor and poet who worked on Tamil films and television serials.

Career
Amarasigamani began his acting career in drama troupes, working with actors such as S. V. Sahasranamam, Komal Swaminathan and V. Gopalakrishnan. He later wrote the dialogue for the Tamil film Mudhalai (Dost Magarmach).

Amarasigamani notably worked on films such as Anniyan (2005), Sivaji (2007) and Evano Oruvan (2007). On television, he made appearances in the shows Sontham, Uravugal and Ponnunjal.

The government of Tamil Nadu honored Amarasigamani with the Kalaimamani award in the 'Sirantha Gunachitra Nadigar' (Best Character Artist) category. He was also awarded the 'Kavimaamani' award (Best Poet) by Bharathy Kalai Kazhagam in Chennai.

Death
He died aged 70 on 21 June 2021, following a cardiac arrest. He had suffered from Parkinson's disease for several years prior to his death. He was survived by his wife Shyamala Devi, three sons and a daughter.

Partial filmography

Films
As actor

Naan Adimai Illai (1986)
Pagaivan (1997)
Raman Abdullah (1997)
Bharathi (2000)
Baba (2002)
Ramanaa (2002)
Julie Ganapathi (2003)
Anniyan (2005)
Adhu Oru Kana Kaalam (2005)
Rendu (2006)
Sivaji (2007)
Evano Oruvan (2007)
Guru Sishyan (2010)
Eththan (2011)
Sadhurangam (2011)
Aachariyangal (2012)
Maanga (2015)
Killadi (2015)

Television
Premi (1998)
Oru Pennin Kadhai (1998-2000)
Sontham (1999)
Take it Easy vazhkai (2001-02)
sorgam (2003-04)
Ahalya (2004)
Nimmathi (2005-2007)
Ketti Melam (2006-2008)
Kasthuri (2006)
Surya (2006)
Vairanenjam (2007-2009)
aadajanma  (2008-2010(Star Maa))
Swarna manasu (2008-2010(Asianet))
Girija M.A. (2007-2008)
Uravugal (2009)
Ponnunjal (2013)

References

External links

2021 deaths
Tamil male television actors
21st-century Tamil male actors
Male actors from Tamil Nadu
Tamil poets
1950 births